Cilleros is a municipality located in the province of Cáceres, Extremadura, Spain. According to the 2006 census (INE), the municipality has a population of 1962 inhabitants. It is the birthplace of Real Madrid footballer, Fernando Morientes.

References

Municipalities in the Province of Cáceres
Portugal–Spain border crossings